Šimljanik   is a village in Croatia. It is connected by the D26 highway. In 2011, 34 inhabitants lived there.

Populated places in Bjelovar-Bilogora County